The 2017 Weber State Wildcats football team represented Weber State University in the 2017 NCAA Division I FCS football season. The Wildcats were led by fourth-year head coach Jay Hill and played their games at Stewart Stadium as members of the Big Sky Conference. They finished the season 11–3, 7–1 in Big Sky play to finish in a tie for the Big Sky championship with Southern Utah. Due to their head-to-head loss to Southern Utah in the regular season, they did not receive the Big Sky's automatic bid to the FCS Playoffs, but did receive an at-large bid to the FCS Playoffs, their second straight trip to the playoffs. In the first round, they defeated Western Illinois. In the second round, they avenged their regular season loss to Southern Utah. In the quarterfinals, they lost to eventual national runner-up, James Madison.

Previous season 
The Wildcats finished the 2016 season 7–5, 6–2 in Big Sky play to finish in third place. They received an at-large bid to the FCS Playoffs, their first trip to the playoffs since 2009, where they lost to Chattanooga in the first round.

Schedule

Despite also being a member of the Big Sky Conference, the game with Sacramento State on September 16 was considered a non-conference game.

Game summaries

Montana Western

at California

at Sacramento State

UC Davis

at Montana State

Southern Utah

at Cal Poly

Montana

at Eastern Washington

at Portland State

Idaho State

FCS Playoffs

Western Illinois–First Round

at Southern Utah–Second Round

at James Madison–Quarterfinals

Ranking movements

References

Weber State
Weber State Wildcats football seasons
Big Sky Conference football champion seasons
Weber State
Weber State Wildcats football